Jikata is a town in Aguie Department, Maradi Region, Niger.  Lying almost halfway between Aguie (24km to its southwest) and Tessaoua (to its northeast), the town is well off the major autoroute running between the two cities.

Since the late 1990s, Jikata, along with the neighboring towns of Dourgou and Guidan Bakoye, has been the site of an international anti-erosion and anti-desertification initiative.

References

Falling Rain .com

Populated places in Niger
Maradi Region